Alt-Bichelsee Castle is a ruined castle in the Swiss Canton of Thurgau in the municipality of Bichelsee-Balterswil.

See also
 List of castles in Switzerland

References

History of Thurgau
Castles in Thurgau